Norfolk Southern may refer to:

Norfolk Southern Railway, a railroad operating throughout the Eastern United States
Norfolk Southern Railway (1942–82), a defunct, smaller railroad, now part of the current railroad
Norfolk Southern Corporation, parent company of the Norfolk Southern Railway